is a Sega Mega Drive Mahjong video game that was released exclusively in Japan in 1990. Part of the Tel-Tel series that included Tel-Tel Stadium, it was one of the few games that used the Mega Modem, allowing for two-player games via the Sega Net Work System. Up to three players can play the "host" player in addition to being able to play against computer opponents.

References

1990 video games
Japan-exclusive video games
Sega Genesis games
Sega Genesis-only games
Sega Meganet games
Sunsoft games
Multiplayer and single-player video games
Video games developed in Japan
Mahjong video games